Jehoash, Joash, Joas (in the Biblical cases) or Yehoash may refer to:

 Joash the Abiezrite, Hebrew religious leader (fl. 2nd millennium BCE)
 Jehoash of Judah, Hebrew ruler (reign c. 836–797 BCE)
 Jehoash of Israel, Hebrew ruler (reign c. 798–782 BCE)
 Iyoas I (d. 1769), Emperor of Ethiopia
 Iyoas II (d. 1821), Emperor of Ethiopia
 Yehoash (poet), pen name of Solomon Bloomgarden (1872–1927), Lithuanian-born Yiddish poet